This is a list of ancient Egyptian sites, throughout all of Egypt and Nubia. Sites are listed by their classical name whenever possible, if not by their modern name, and lastly with their ancient name if no other is available.

Nomes 

A nome is a subnational administrative division of Ancient Egypt.

Lower Egypt 
Nome 1: White Walls
Nome 2: Cow's thigh
Nome 3: West
Nome 4: Southern Shield
Nome 5: Northern Shield
Nome 6: Mountain bull
Nome 7: West harpoon
Nome 8: East harpoon
Nome 9: Andjety
Nome 10: Black bull
Nome 11: Heseb bull
Nome 12: Calf and Cow
Nome 13: Prospering Scepter
Nome 14: Eastmost
Nome 15: Fish
Nome 16: Djehuti
Nome 17: The Throne
Nome 18: Prince of the South
Nome 19: Prince of the North
Nome 20: Plumed Falcon

Upper Egypt 
Nome 1: Land of the bow
Nome 2: Throne of Horus
Nome 3: The Shrine
Nome 4: The sceptre
Nome 5: The two falcons
Nome 6: The crocodile
Nome 7: Sistrum
Nome 8: Great lands
Nome 9: Minu (Min)
Nome 10: Cobra
Nome 11: The Set animal (Seth)
Nome 12: Viper mountain
Nome 13: Upper pomegranate tree (Upper Sycamore and Viper)
Nome 14: Lower pomegranate tree (Lower Sycamore and Viper)
Nome 15: Hare
Nome 16: Oryx
Nome 17: The black dog (Jackal)
Nome 18: Falcon with spread wings (Nemty)
Nome 19: The pure sceptre (Two Sceptres)
Nome 20: Upper laurel (Southern Sycamore)
Nome 21: Lower laurel (Northern Sycamore)
Nome 22: Knife

Lower Egypt (The Nile Delta) 

 Alexandria
 Great Library of Alexandria
 Pharos of Alexandria
 Pompey's Pillar
 Athribis (Modern: "Tell Atrib", Ancient: "Hut-Heryib" or "Hut-Tahery-Ibt")
 Avaris (Modern: "Tell el-Dab'a", Ancient: "Pi-Ri'amsese")
 Behbeit el-Hagar
 Bilbeis
 Bubastis (Modern: "Tell Basta", Ancient: "Bast")
 Busiris (Modern: "Abu Sir Bana")
 Buto (Modern: "Tell el-Fara'in", Ancient: "Pe")
 Cairo (or near Cairo)
 Abu Rawash
 Giza Necropolis (Giza Plateau)
 Khufu's Pyramid (Great Pyramid)
 Khafre's Pyramid
 Menkaure's Pyramid
 Great Sphinx of Giza
 Heliopolis (Modern: "Tell Hisn", Ancient: "Iunu")
 Letopolis (Modern: "Ausim", Ancient: "Khem")
 Hermopolis Parva (Modern: "El-Baqliya" Ancient: "Ba'h")
 Iseum (Modern: "Behbeit el-Hagar", Ancient: "Hebyt")
 Kom el-Hisn (Ancient: "Imu" or "Yamu")
 Kom-el-Gir
 Leontopolis (Yahudiya) (Modern: "Tell el-Yahudiya", Ancient: "Nay-Ta-Hut")
 Leontopolis (Modern: "Tell el-Muqdam")
 Naukratis (Modern: "el-Gi'eif", "el-Niqrash","el-Nibeira")
 Memphite Necropolis (Memphis)
 Abu Ghurab
 Abusir (Busiris)
Pyramid of Neferefre
Pyramid of Neferirkare
Pyramid of Nyuserre
Pyramid of Sahure
Sun temple of Nyuserre
Sun temple of Userkaf
 Dahshur
 Bent Pyramid
 Black Pyramid
 Red Pyramid
 White Pyramid
 Helwan
 Mazghuna
 Northern Mazghuna pyramid
 Southern Mazghuna pyramid
 Mit Rahina
 Saqqara
 Sekhemkhet's Buried Pyramid
 Gisr el-mudir
 Haram el-Shawaf
 Pyramid of Ibi
 Pyramid of Khendjer
 Pyramid of Teti
 Pyramid of Unas
 Pyramid of Userkaf
 Step Pyramid of Djoser
 Southern South Saqqara pyramid
 Zawyet el'Aryan
 Layer Pyramid
 Unfinished Northern Pyramid of Zawyet El Aryan
 Mendes (Modern: "Tell el-Rub'a", Ancient: "'Anpet")
 Tell Tebilla
 Qantir / El-Khata'na
 Sais (Modern: "Sa el-Hagar", Ancient: "Zau")
 Saft el-Hinna (Ancient: "Per-Sopdu")
 Sebennytos (Modern: "Samannud", Ancient: "Tjebnutjer")
 Shagamba
 Suwa
 Taposiris Magna (Modern: "Abusir")
 Tanis (Modern: "San el-Hagar", Ancient: "Djan'net")
 Tell el-Maskhuta (Ancient: "Tjeku")
 Tell el-Rataba
 Tell el-Sahaba
 Tell Nebesha
 Tell Qua'
 Terenuthis (Modern: "Kom Abu Billo")
 Thmuis (Modern: "Tell el-Timai")
 Tura
 Xois (Modern: "Sakha")

Middle Egypt 
The area from about Faiyum to Asyut is usually referred to as Middle Egypt.

 Akoris (Modern: "Tihna el-Gebel")
 Fraser Tombs
 Amarna (Ancient: "Akhetaten")
 Ankyronpolis (Modern: "el-Hiba", Ancient: "Teudjoi")
 Antinoöpolis (Modern: "el-Sheikh 'Ibada")
 Dara
 Pyramid of Khui
 Deir el-Bersha
 Deir el-Gabrawi
 Dishasha
 Dja (Modern: "Medinet Madi" Ancient: "Narmouthis")
 El-Sheikh Sa'id
 Faiyum
 Crocodilopolis (Roman period: "Arsinoe", Ancient: "Shedet")
 el-Lahun
 Hawara
 Herakleopolis Magna (Modern: "Ihnasiyyah al-Madinah", Ancient: "Henen-Nesut")
 Kom Medinet Gurob
 Lisht
 Meidum
 Sidment el-Gebel
 Soknopaiou Nesos
 Tarkhan
 Hermopolis Magna (Modern: "El Ashmunein", Ancient: "Khmun")
 Hebenu (Modern: "Kom el-Ahmar")
 Beni Hasan
 Speos Artemidos (Modern: "Istabl 'Antar")
 Zawyet el-Maiyitin
 
 Herwer
 Lykopolis (Modern: "Asyut", Ancient: "Zawty")
 Meir
 Oxyrhynchus (Modern: "el-Bahnasa", Ancient: "Per-Medjed")
 Sharuna
 Tuna el-Gebel

Upper Egypt

Northern Upper Egypt 

 Abydos (Ancient: "Abedju")
 el-'Araba el Madfuna
 Kom el-Sultan
 Umm el-Qa'ab
 Shunet ez Zebib
 Osireion
 Apollinopolis Parva (Modern: "Qus", Ancient: "Gesa" or "Gesy")
 Antaeopolis (Modern: "Qaw el-Kebir", Ancient: "Tjebu" or "Djew-Qa")
 Ar Raqāqinah (Known as "Reqaqnah")
 Athribis (Modern: "Wannina", Ancient: "Hut-Repyt")
 Beit Khallaf
 Diospolis Parva (Modern: "Hiw", Ancient: "Hut-Sekhem")
 el-Hawawish
 el-Salamuni
 Khemmis or Panopolis (Modern: "Akhmin", Ancient: "Ipu" or "Khent-Min")
 El Hawawish
 El Salamuni
 Gebel el-Haridi
 Idfa
 Khenoboskion (Modern: "el-Qasr", "el-Saiyad")
 Koptos (Modern: "Qift", Ancient: "Gebtu")
 Naga ed-Der
 Nag' el-Madamud (Ancient: "Mabu")
 Ombos (Naqada) (Modern: "Naqada", Ancient: "Nubt")
 Shanhûr

Southern Upper Egypt 

 Aphroditopolis (Modern: "Gebelein", Ancient: "Per-Hathor")
 Apollinopolis Magna (Modern: "Edfu", Ancient: "Djeba, Mesen")
 Aswan
 el-Mo'alla (Ancient: "Hefat")
 Eileithyiaspolis (Modern: "el-Kab", Ancient: "Nekheb")
 Gebel el-Silsila (Ancient: "Kheny")
 Hermonthis (Modern: "Armant", Ancient: "Iuny")
 Hierakonpolis (Modern: "Kom el-Ahmar", Ancient: "Nekhen")
 Kom al-Ahmar Necropolis
 Iu-miteru
 Kom Ombo
 Latopolis (Modern: "Esna", Ancient: "Iunyt, Senet, Tasenet")
 Luxor (Ancient: "Ipet-Resyt")
 Deir el-Bahari
 Qasr el-'Aguz
 Qurna
 el-Assasif
 el-Khokha
 el-Tarif
 Dra' Abu el-Naga'
 Qurnet Murai
 Sheikh Abd el-Qurna
 Valley of the Kings
 Valley of the Queens
 Sumenu
 Tuphium (Modern: "Tod", Ancient: "Djerty")

Lower Nubia 

 New Amada
 Abu Simbel
 Contra Pselchis (Modern: "Quban", Ancient: "Baki")
 Debod
 el-Lessiya
 Mi'am (Modern: "'Aniba")
 Qasr Ibrim / Primis (Modern: "Qasr Ibrim")
 Pselchis (Modern: "el-Dakka", Ancient: "Pselqet")
 Temple of Dakka
 New Kalabsha
 Beit el-Wali
 Temple of Derr
 Gerf Hussein
 New Wadi es-Sebua
 Taphis (Modern: "Tafa")
 Tutzis (Modern: "Dendur")
 Tzitzis (Modern: "Qertassi")

Upper Nubia 

 'Amara East
 'Amara West
 Abahuda (Abu Oda)
 Aksha (Serra West)
 Askut Island
 Buhen
 Dabenarti
 Dibeira
 Dorginarti Island
 Faras
 Gebel el-Shams
 Gebel Barkal
 Kor
 Kumma
 Meinarti Island
 Qustul
 Semna
 Semna South
 Serra East
 Shalfak
 Uronarti Island

Oases and Mediterranean coast 

 Siwa Oasis
 Aghurmi
 el-Zeitun
 Gebel el-Mawta
 Qaret el-Musabberin
 Umm el-'Ebeida
 Bahariya Oasis
 el-Qasr
 el-Bawiti
 el-Hayz
 Farafra Oasis
 'Ain el-Wadi
 el-Qasr
 el-Dakhla Oasis
 Amheida
 Balat
 Deir el-Hager
 el-Qasr
 Kellis (Modern: "Ismant el-Kharab")
 Mut el-Kharab
 Qaret el-Muzawwaqa
 el-Kharga Oasis
 Baris
 Gebel el-Teir
 Hibis
 Kysis (Modern: "Dush")
 Nadurs
 Qasr el-Ghueida
 Qasr Zaiyan
 Mediterranean Coast
 Zawiyet Umm el-Rakham

Sinai 
Aqaba
Arsinoe
Eilat (Elath)
Kuntillet Ajrud
Pelusium (Sin)
 Rud el-'Air
 Serabit el-Khadim
 Tell Kedwa
 Wadi Maghareh

Eastern Desert 
 Wadi Hammamat

Notes and references

Bibliography 
 Atlas of Ancient Egypt, John Baines & Jaromir Malek, America University of Cairo Press, 2002

 List
Sites
 List